Sam Klein is an Australian professional footballer who plays as a midfielder for Brisbane Roar.

References

External links

Living people
Australian soccer players
Association football midfielders
Brisbane Roar FC players
National Premier Leagues players
A-League Men players
People from Gympie
2004 births